Bradley R. Listorti (born October 11, 1984 in Milford, Connecticut) is a former American football tight end. He was signed by the Atlanta Falcons as an undrafted free agent in 2008. He played college football at Massachusetts.

Listorti has also been a member of the New York Jets and New England Patriots.

References

External links
New England Patriots bio
UMass Minutemen bio

1984 births
Living people
People from Milford, Connecticut
Players of American football from Connecticut
American football tight ends
Rutgers Scarlet Knights football players
UMass Minutemen football players
Atlanta Falcons players
New York Jets players
New England Patriots players